First You Live is the title of Dusty Rhodes and the River Band's second album, released on October 19, 2007.

Track listing
All songs written and arranged by Dusty Rhodes and the River Band.
 "Intro"
 "First You Live"
 "Leaving Tennessee"
 "Ghost Trails"
 "Dear Honey"
 "Oh Icicle"
 "Strike"
 "Keys To The Truck"
 "Then You Pass"
 "Street Fighter"
 "Grampa Mac"
 "Goodnight, Moonshine"
 "The Ballad Of Graff"

Personnel

Dusty Rhodes and the River Band
Dustin Apodaca: Vocals, Keyboards, Accordion
Kyle Divine: Guitars, Harmonica, Vocals
Edson Choi: Electric, Acoustic and Lap Steel Guitars, Banjo, Sitar, Vocals
Andrea Babinski: Violin, Mandolin, Vocals
Allen Van Orman: Bass
Eric Chirco: Drums, Percussion
Tim Schneider: Drums, Percussion

Additional Personnel
Anthony Arvizu: Percussion
Stephen Hodges: Tympani
Horns (Phillip Inzerillo: Trombone; Jared Parsons: Saxophone) and strings (Katie Mendenhall: Cello) arranged by Andrea Babinski
Megan McCliesh: Vocals

Production
Produced by Isiah "Ikey" Owens
Recording Engineers: Anthony Arvizu, Jeff "Lightning" Lewis and Marcus Samperio
Mixed by Ryan Williams
Mastered by Eddy Schreyer

References

External links
 Dusty Rhodes and the River Band at Sideonedummy

2007 albums
SideOneDummy Records albums